Bimaximal mixing refers to a proposed form of the lepton mixing matrix. The moduli squared of the matrix elements have to be:
.

.
Alternatively,  and  can be used, which corresponds to:
.

Phenomenology 
The L/E flatness of the electron-like event ratio at Super-Kamiokande severely restricts the CP-conserving neutrino mixing matrices
to the form:

Tribimaximal mixing and golden-ratio mixing also correspond to an angle in the above parametrization. Bimaximal mixing, along with these other mixing schemes, have been falsified by a non-zero .

See also 
 Trimaximal mixing
 Tribimaximal mixing
 Neutrino oscillation
 Double Chooz

References 

Leptons
Standard Model
Neutrinos